Mallupy Entertainment is a Brazilian entertainment company founded in 2003 in Florianópolis, Brazil.

History
The Mallupy Entertainment operates since 2003 in the communication business, with event production, dissemination of artists, support for radio stations, and repositioning of brands on the market . Today is one of the largest and leading producers of the southern events.
With prominent name in the national market, Mallupy for more than 180 operations during the year, reaches an audience of 1 million people and is present in bigger and better homes in southern Brazil .

Recording artists

Groups
 Raça Negra (inactive)
 Sorriso Maroto

Duos
 Jorge & Mateus
 Guilerme & Santiago
 Victor & Leo
 Matheus & Kaua

Soloists
 Alexandre Pires
 
 Wesley Safadão
 Thiaguinho 
 Lexa
 MC Guimê

References

External links

  (Portuguese)

Entertainment companies established in 2003
Entertainment companies of Brazil